Salisbury Sixth Form College (S6C) is a free school sixth form in the city of Salisbury in the English county of Wiltshire.

The college was established in 2014 and opened in temporary accommodation. However the college moved into a new purpose-built building on Tollgate Road in May 2016.

Salisbury Sixth Form College offers a range of A-levels as courses of study for students, as well as some BTECs and Cambridge Technicals. Facilities include an Achievement and Progress Centre for private study, purpose-designed science labs, a fitness suite, a fully equipped theatre, a dance studio with sprung flooring and a multi-use games area. The average class size across the college is 15, with no class over 24.

Academic performance
In 2017 S6C was awarded a Good rating by Ofsted. The inspection report said that "Governors and college leaders have successfully created an ethos of tolerance, respect and high aspirations for learners" and that S6C has "quickly and effectively responded to the need for additional, local sixth-form provision for learners who have a wide range of academic achievement at the end of key stage 4.

The college's A-level results are overall "average" compared to other schools and colleges in England, with a progress score of 0.00, which puts S6C in the top 3 sixth forms in Salisbury for progress made, and an average grade of C.

In 2017 S6C's A level results showed:
 Overall results in the top 20% of colleges in the country when measured using value added. 
 Nearly half of A level students achieved A* to B and* nearly ¾ achieving A* to C.
 2017 saw the first S6C student to progress on to the University of Oxford.
 A significant increase in the numbers of students getting a place at Russell Group Universities.
 99% pass rate at A level.

References

External links
 

Free schools in England
Educational institutions established in 2014
2014 establishments in England
Education in Wiltshire
Buildings and structures in Salisbury